Cechides amoenus is a species of curculionid weevil, native to Western Australia.

It is the main seed predator of Banksia prionotes.

References 

Cyclominae
Arthropods of Western Australia
Insects of Australia